Estill is an unincorporated community and coal town in Floyd County, Kentucky, United States. Their post office closed in 1995.

References

Unincorporated communities in Floyd County, Kentucky
Unincorporated communities in Kentucky
Coal towns in Kentucky